Jefferson Township is one of twelve townships in Huntington County, Indiana, United States. As of the 2010 census, its population was 757 and it contained 330 housing units.

History
Jefferson Township was organized in 1843. It was named for President Thomas Jefferson.

Geography

Cities and towns
 Mount Etna (southeast quarter)

Unincorporated towns
 Milo
 Pleasant Plain

Adjacent townships
 Lancaster Township (north)
 Rock Creek Township (northeast)
 Salamonie Township (east)
 Jackson Township, Wells County (southeast)
 Van Buren Township, Grant County (south)
 Washington Township, Grant County (southwest)
 Wayne Township (west)
 Polk Township (northwest)

Cemeteries
The township contains two cemeteries: Purviance and Taylor.

Major highways
  Interstate 69
  State Road 5
  State Road 124
  State Road 218

References
 
 United States Census Bureau cartographic boundary files

External links
 Indiana Township Association
 United Township Association of Indiana

Townships in Huntington County, Indiana
Townships in Indiana